Phan Đình Thắng (born 2 October 1993) is a Vietnamese footballer who plays as a midfielder for V.League 1 club Sông Lam Nghệ An.

Honours

Club
Quang Nam
 V.League 1: 2017

References 

1993 births
Living people
Vietnamese footballers
Association football midfielders
V.League 1 players
Quang Nam FC players
People from Da Nang